Chernoyarovo is a rural locality (a selo) in Mukhorshibirsky District, Republic of Buryatia, Russia. The population was 7 as of 2010. There is 1 street.

Geography 
Chernoyarovo is located 80 km southwest of Mukhorshibir (the district's administrative centre) by road. Podlopatki is the nearest rural locality.

References 

Rural localities in Mukhorshibirsky District